Dicentria cymatila is a moth of the family Notodontidae. It is found in north-eastern Ecuador.

The length of the forewings is 21–22.5 mm. The ground colour of the forewings is light sandy brown and the ground colour of the hindwings is golden white, although the anterior and anal margins are light maroon.

Etymology
The species name is derived from Latin cymatilis (meaning sea-coloured blue) and refers to a blue tinge on the crest of blackish grey scales located between the antennae.

References

Moths described in 2011
Notodontidae